United Nations Security Council Resolution 16, adopted on January 10, 1947, recognized the establishment of the Free Territory of Trieste, recording its approval of the three documents submitted.

The resolution was adopted by 10 votes, with one abstention from Australia.

See also
List of United Nations Security Council Resolutions 1 to 100 (1946–1953)

References
Text of the Resolution at undocs.org

External links
 

 0016
1947 in Europe
Trieste
Italy–Yugoslavia relations
1947 in Italy
1947 in Yugoslavia
 0016
History of Friuli-Venezia Giulia
January 1947 events